Richard Paul Cueroni (born February 1, 1930) is a retired United States Coast Guard rear admiral. He served as Commandant of the United States Coast Guard Academy from June 1986 to June 1989.

References

1930 births
United States Coast Guard admirals
Living people